is a Japanese politician of the Democratic Party of Japan, a member of the House of Representatives in the Diet (national legislature). A native of Shibuya, Tokyo and graduate of Seijo University, she worked at the public broadcaster NHK from 1972 to 1998. She was elected to the House of Councilors for the first time in 1998 and then to the House of Representatives for the first time in April 2003.  In September 2011 she was appointed Minister of Health, Labour and Welfare in the cabinet of newly appointed prime minister Yoshihiko Noda.

References

Additional sources 
 政治家情報 〜小宮 at JANJAN

External links 
  in Japanese.

Category:

Members of the House of Representatives (Japan)
Members of the House of Councillors (Japan)
Women government ministers of Japan
Female members of the House of Representatives (Japan)
Female members of the House of Councillors (Japan)
People from Shibuya
Living people
1948 births
Democratic Party of Japan politicians
Ministers of Health, Labour and Welfare of Japan
Noda cabinet
21st-century Japanese politicians
21st-century Japanese women politicians
Seijo University alumni